Hudson Bay Mountain is an ultra prominent peak located above Smithers, British Columbia, Canada. It is the location of the Hudson Bay Mountain Resort (formerly Ski Smithers) ski resort.  It was also used as a filming location for the movies The Grey and Eight Below. A well-established local name, it refers to the mountain's proximity to a ranch once owned by the Hudson's Bay Company at nearby Driftwood Creek. Hudson Bay Mountain Resort is known for the Rotary Community Trail to Town, an 8 km run down the mountain into the town of Smithers.

Lifts:

Runs :

References

External links
Peakbagger: Hudson Bay Mountain
Hudson Bay Mountain Resort Official Web Site

Ski areas and resorts in British Columbia
Two-thousanders of British Columbia
Range 5 Coast Land District